Extinction vortices are a class of models through which conservation biologists, geneticists and ecologists can understand the dynamics of and categorize extinctions in the context of their causes. This model shows the events that ultimately lead small populations to become increasingly vulnerable as they spiral toward extinction. Developed by M. E. Gilpin and M. E. Soulé in 1986, there are currently four classes of extinction vortices. The first two (R and D) deal with environmental factors that have an effect on the ecosystem or community level, such as disturbance, pollution, habitat loss etc. Whereas the second two (F and A) deal with genetic factors such as inbreeding depression and outbreeding depression, genetic drift etc.

Types of vortices

R Vortex: The R vortex is initiated when there is a disturbance which facilitates a lowering of population size (N) and a corresponding increase in variability (Var(r)). This event can make populations vulnerable to additional disturbances which will lead to further decreases in population size (N) and further increases in variability (Var(r)). A prime example of this would be the disruption of sex ratios in a population away from the species optimum.
D Vortex: The D vortex is initiated when population size (N) decreases and variability (Var(r)) increases such that the spatial distribution (D) of the population is increased and the population becomes "patchy" or fragmented. Within these fragments, local extinction rates increase which, through positive feedback, further increases D.
F Vortex: The F vortex is initiated by a decrease in population size (N) which leads to a decrease in heterozygosity, and therefore a decrease in genetic diversity. Decreased population size makes the effects of genetic drift more prominent, resulting in increased risk of inbreeding depression and an increase in population genetic load, which over time will result in extinction.
A Vortex: The A vortex is a result of an increase in the impact of genetic drift on the population, due to the population's decreased size. This corresponds with a decrease in genetic variance which leads to a decrease in "population adaptive potential", and eventual extinction. This vortex can result from biological invasion, resulting in large scale hybridization and outbreeding depression.

Extinction vortex factors

Environmental factors
Many of the environmental events that contribute to an extinction vortex do so through reduction in population size. These events can include rapid loss of population size due to disease, natural disasters, and climate change. Habitat loss and/or habitat degradation can also kick start an extinction vortex. Other factors include events that occur more gradually, such over-harvesting (hunting, fishing, etc.), or excessive predation.

Genetic factors

Populations that succumb to an extinction vortex experience strong genetic factors that cause already small populations to decrease in size over time. All populations experience genetic drift, a random process that causes changes in the population genetic structure over time. Small populations are particularly vulnerable to rapid changes in population genetic structure due to the random nature gamete sampling. When a population is small, any change in alleles can disproportionately impact the population. Thus, genetic drift leads small populations to lose genetic diversity.

Additionally, when populations become small, inbreeding increases because individuals are more likely to mate with others with a genome that contains many of the same alleles. Inbreeding can lead to inbreeding depression within the population, and this can cause fewer offspring, more birth defects, more individuals prone to disease, decreased survival and reproduction (fitness), and decreased genetic diversity within the population. With a decrease in genetic diversity comes even greater likelihood of inbreeding and inbreeding depression.

Another genetic factor that can lead small populations toward the spiral of extinction is limited gene flow. For example, if a population becomes isolated due to habitat fragmentation, migration rates decrease or become non-existent, causing the population to lose genetic diversity over time and increasing inbreeding. Migration is important because new individuals from outside of the population will almost certainly add new genetic variation, which can increase overall fitness within the population.

One example of the role of genetics in extinction occurs in the case of fragmented metapopulations of southern dunlins (Calidris alpine schinzii) in SW Sweden. These endangered shorebirds experienced inbreeding and loss of genetic diversity at two molecular markers examined, and this limited survival and reproduction throughout the population by increasing inbreeding. When parent dunlins with more similar genetics mated, their offspring had lower likelihood of hatching, and if they did manage to hatch, they were more likely to die soon after hatching.

Demographic factors
Demographic factors that are involved in extinction vortices include reduced fecundity, changes in dispersal patterns, and decreased population density.

See also
Error catastrophe
Error threshold
Muller's ratchet
Mutational meltdown
Population dynamics
Small population size

References

Vortex